Kodomo is the moniker for electronic musician Chris Child, an Emmy award-winning full-time composer who lives and works in Portland, Maine. As Kodomo, he is best known for his work on the Harmonix video games Amplitude, and Frequency as well as the iPod game Phase, which features Kodomo's "Spira Mirabilis."  is the Japanese word for "child"—both a reference to his surname and the fact that he grew up in Japan.

Kodomo's first full-length album Still Life is a highly conceptual piece in which the music was all inspired by a set of photographs taken during Kodomo's travels in the US and abroad. The tracks are all titled using the photographic images rather than words. For example, Concept 13 started with a photograph that reflects the Fibonacci proportions that are repeatedly found in nature. These proportions were used to govern the musical composition in the melodic theme, the sonic texture, and even the pace of development of the piece. In this case, .618 is the governing number, and themes are introduced at these intervals, which give the whole composition a balanced and natural-feeling proportion.

Discography
Albums
Still Life (2008)
Frozen In Motion (2011)
Patterns & Light (2014)
Three Spheres (2021)
Singles
"Spira Mirabilis" (2007)
"Concept 11" (2008)
"Decoder" (2011)
"Mind Like a Diamond" (2014)
EPs
"Concept 11 Remixes EP" (2008)
"Divider – EP" (2017)
Remixes
Freezepop – Fashion Impression Function (2001)
Freezepop – Hi-Five My Remix (2003)
Freezepop – Maxi Ultra•Fresh (2004)
Freezepop – Fashion Impression Function (2007 Re-Release)
Emilia Sosa – Rhythm of Life Remixes (2007)

Compilations
OM Yoga Mix 2 (2008)

Influences
Kodomo's work falls within the genres of Ambient Techno, IDM, Electronic Music and Experimental Music. He was influenced by artists such as Erik Satie, Brian Eno, Kraftwerk, DJ Shadow, Boards of Canada, Cabaret Voltaire and J.S. Bach.

References

External links
Official website of Kodomo
Official website of Chris Child

American electronic musicians
Living people
Remixers
Year of birth missing (living people)